Zartman is a surname. Notable people with the surname include:

I. William Zartman (born 1932), American academic
Pat Zartman, American volleyball coach

See also
Evon Zartman Vogt (1918–2004), American anthropologist